Judith Ariana Fitzgerald (11 November 1952 – 25 November 2015) was a Canadian poet and journalist.  Born in Toronto, Ontario, she attended York University (where she earned her BA and MA; she did her doctoral work at the University of Toronto). She authored over twenty books of poetry, as well as biographies of musician Sarah McLachlan and Marshall McLuhan. She died in her home in Northern Ontario, at the age of 63.

Bibliography

Poetry
 1970: Octave. Toronto: Dreadnaught
 1972: City Park. Agincourt, ON: Northern Concept
 1975: Journal Entries. Toronto: Dreadnaught Press
 1975: Victory. Toronto: Coach House Press
 1977: Lacerating Heartwood. Toronto: Coach House Press
 1981: Easy Over. Windsor: Black Moss Press
 1983: Split/Levels. Toronto: Coach House Press
 1984: The Syntax of Things. Toronto: Prototype
 1983: Heart Attack[s]. Canada: privately published
 1984: Beneath the Skin of Paradise:  The Piaf Poems. Windsor: Black Moss Press
 1985: My Orange Gorange. Windsor: Black Moss Press
 1985: Given Names: New and Selected Poems 1972–1985. Ed. Frank Davey. Windsor: Black Moss Press
 1986: Whale Waddleby. Windsor: Black Moss Press
 1987: Diary of Desire. Windsor, ON: Black Moss Press
 1991: Rapturous Chronicles. Stratford, ON: Mercury Press
 Ultimate Midnight. Windsor, ON: Black Moss Press
 1992: Habit of Blues: Rapturous Chronicles II. Stratford, ON: Mercury Press, 1993
 1993: walkin' wounded. Windsor, ON: Black Moss Press
 1995: River. Toronto: ECW Press
 1999: 26 Ways Out of This World. Ottawa: Oberon
 2003: Iphigenia's Song (Adagios Quartet vol. 1). Ottawa: Oberon Press
 2004: Orestes' Lament (Adagios Quartet vol. 2). Ottawa: Oberon Press
 2006: Electra's Benison (Adagios Quartet vol. 3). Ottawa: Oberon Press
 2007: O, Clytaemnestra! (Adagios Quartet vol. 4). Ottawa: Oberon Press
 2015: wtf,

Prose
 1997: Building A Mystery: The Story of Sarah McLachlan and Lilith Fair. Kingston, ON: Quarry Music Books
 2000: Sarah McLachlan:  Building a Mystery. Kingston, ON: Quarry Music Books, Millennial Edition
 2001: Marshall McLuhan: Wise Guy. Montreal: XYZ

Edited
 1982: Un Dozen: Thirteen Canadian Poets. Windsor, ON: Black Moss
 1986: SP/ELLES: Poetry by Canadian Women. Windsor, ON: Black Moss Press
 1988: First Person Plural. Windsor, ON: Black Moss Press
 2000: Bagne, or, Criteria for Heaven, by Rob Mclennan. Fredericton, NB: Broken Jaw Press

Except where noted, bibliographic information courtesy Brock University.

References
 W. H. New, ed. Encyclopedia of Literature in Canada.'' Toronto: University of Toronto Press, 2002: 376.

Notes

External links
 Judith Fitzgerald's WriteSite Official Website
 The Canadian Encyclopedia Philip Milito on Judith Fitzgerald's life, career, and contribution to Canadian culture (with links)
 Ottawa Poetry Newsletter Concerning The Mad Bomber of Canada's House of Commons

1952 births
2015 deaths
20th-century Canadian poets
Canadian women poets
Writers from Toronto
21st-century Canadian poets
20th-century Canadian women writers
21st-century Canadian women writers